The University of Notre Dame's annual commencement exercises are held each May, currently in the Notre Dame Stadium. The exercises award undergraduate and graduate degrees.

Traditions

During commencement, the Laetare Medal is awarded.

Notre Dame is known for inviting US presidents to deliver the commencement address, especially in the year of their inauguration. Six recent presidents have delivered the address, including Dwight D. Eisenhower, Jimmy Carter, Ronald Reagan, George Bush, George W. Bush, and Barack Obama. Most recently, Vice President Mike Pence spoke instead of President Donald Trump, as the president was visiting Saudi Arabia. Notre Dame leads the non-military university by most presidents delivering the address at commencement. Joseph Biden (who had previously spoken at commencement in 2016 as the awardee of the Laetare Medal) was invited in 2021, but could not attend due to scheduling issues.

List of Commencement speakers
1861: John McMullen, priest and teacher from Chicago
1865: William Tecumseh Sherman, Union General during the Civil War
1867: T.E. Corcoran, editor of The Catholic Telegraph
1870: Paul Broder, professor from Beloit College, Wisconsin
1871: Augustus C. Dodge, U.S. Senator from Iowa
1872: Joseph Dwenger, Bishop of Fort Wayne, Indiana
1873: John J. Fitzgibbon, editor of The Western Catholic
1874: S. S. Hayes, Comptroller from City of Chicago
1875: J. S. Morris, from Vicksburg, Mississippi
1876: William J. Onahan, Chicago Catholic activist and businessman
1877: Frank H. Hurd, U.S. Congressman from Ohio
1878: John Lancaster Spalding, Bishop of Peoria, Illinois
1879: No commencement exercises due to the great fire
1880: Edmund Francis Dunne, Chief Justice of Arizona
1881: W. W. Cleary, from Covington, Kentucky
1882: Silas Chatard, Bishop of Vincennes, Indiana
1883: John Ambrose Watterson, Bishop of Columbus, Ohio
1884: Ignacio Montes de Oca y Obregón, Bishop of Linares, Mexico
1885: The scheduled speaker Major General William S. Rosecrans canceled his commitment due to duties in Washington, D.C.
1886: John Lancaster Spalding, Bishop of Peoria, [Illinois
1887: Richard Gilmour, Bishop of Cleveland
1888: P. F. Carr, from Denver, Colorado
1889: William P. Breen, Alumnus from Fort Wayne, Indiana
1890: John Lancaster Spalding, Bishop of Peoria, Illinois
1891: John Lancaster Spalding, Bishop of Peoria, Illinois
1892: John Samuel Foley, Bishop of Detroit, Michigan
1893: Robert Seton, priest from the Diocese of Newark, N.J.
1894: John Ambrose Watterson, Bishop of Columbus, Ohio
1895: John Lancaster Spalding, Bishop of Peoria, Illinois
1896: Thomas A. Moran, judge from Chicago
1897: Joseph F. Mooney, priest from the Archdiocese of New York
1898: Maurice Francis Burke, Bishop of St. Joseph, Missouri
1899: John Lancaster Spalding, Bishop of Peoria, Illinois
1900: John J. Glennon, Bishop of Kansas City, Missouri
1901: John Shanley, Bishop of Fargo, North Dakota
1902: William P. Breen A.B. ’77, A.M. ’80 from Fort Wayne, Indiana
1903: John M. Gearin, attorney from Portland, Oregon
1904: Charles Joseph Bonaparte, attorney, progressive reformer, member of the Board of Indian Commissioners
1905: Marcus A. Kavanagh, judge from Chicago
1906: D. J. Stafford, priest and lecturer from Washington, D.C.
1907: John Talbot Smith, priest, author, lecturer from New York City
1908: Charles P. Neill, U.S. Commissioner of Labor
1909: Hannis Taylor, United States Ambassador to Spain, authority on international law
1910: Thomas Riley Marshall, Governor of Indiana
1911: Charles Fitzpatrick, Chief Justice of Canada
1912: Thomas F. Hickey, Bishop of Rochester, New York
1913: James M. Cox, Governor of Ohio
1914: Joseph E. Ransdell, U.S. Senator from Louisiana
1915: John F. Fitzgerald, Mayor of Boston and U.S. Representative
1916: Martin Joseph Wade, Member of the U.S. House of Representatives from Iowa and Judge of the United States District Court for the Southern District of Iowa
1917: Joseph Chartrand, Coadjutor, Bishop of Indianapolis
1918: Edward N. Hurley, Chairman of the United States Shipping Board
1919: Francis Bickerstaffe-Drew, English war chaplain and novelist
1920: Morgan J. O'Brien, Judge of the New York Supreme Court
1921: David I. Walsh, U.S. Senator from Massachusetts
1922: Kickham Scanlan, Chief Justice of the Criminal Court, Chicago
1923: Thomas Lindsey Blayney, diplomat, veteran of the world war, educator from Rice University, Huston
1924: Woodbridge N. Ferris, U.S. Senator from Michigan
1925: Edmond H. Moore, Democratic National Committee member and attorney from Youngstown, Ohio
1926: Dudley G. Wooten, former U.S. Representative from Texas and Professor of Law at the Notre Dame Law School
1927: Alfred J. Talley, judge on the circuit court of appeals of New York City
1928: Francis O'Shaughnessy, attorney, Chicago
1929: Colonel William J. Donovan, former United States Assistant Attorney General and war hero from Buffalo, New York
1930: Claude G. Bowers, author, editor, orator
1931: Angus Daniel McDonald, Treasurer of the United States Railroad Commission
1932: Owen D. Young, New York City financier
1933: Paul V. McNutt, Governor of Indiana
1934: Frank C. Walker, Chairman of the National Emergency Council
1935: Shane Leslie, essayist, dramatist, lecturer
1936: William J. Mayo, cofounder of Mayo Clinic
1937: Dennis F. Kelly, president of The Fair Store, a Chicago department store
1938: Terence Byrne Cosgrove, attorney from San Francisco
1939: William Henry Harrison, Vice-President and Chief Engineer of AT&T
1940: David Worth Clark, U.S. Senator from Idaho
1941: Joseph P. Kennedy, United States Ambassador to the United Kingdom
1942: J. Edgar Hoover, Director of the FBI
1942-Winter: William F. Jeffers 
1943: Arthur J. Hope, author and editor
1943-Winter: Harry F. Kelly, former Governor of Michigan
1944: Thomas J. Brennan, Notre Dame professor of philosophy
1945: Phillip S. Moore, dean of the Notre Dame Graduate School
1946: George Sokolsky, columnist
1947: General George C. Kenney, Chief of the Strategic Air Command
1948: Paul G. Hoffman, Director of Economic Cooperation Administration, Washington, D.C.
1949: John Stephen Burke, President of B. Altman and Company, New York City
1950-Winter: John F. Kennedy, U.S. Congressman (and later President of the United States of America)
1950: John J. Hearne, ambassador of Ireland to the U.S.
1951: Francis Patrick Matthews, Secretary of the Navy
1952: Charles Malik, Minister of Lebanon to the U.S.
1953: Detlev W. Bronk, president of the Johns Hopkins University
1954: James R. Killian, president of M.I.T.
1955: Herbert Brownell, Attorney General of the United States
1956: Admiral Arleigh A. Burke, Chief of Naval Operations, U.S. Navy
1957: Earl Warren, Chief Justice of the United States Supreme Court
1958: James P. Mitchell, Secretary of Labor
1959: John McCone, Chairman of the Atomic Energy Commission
1960: Dwight D. Eisenhower, 34th President of the United States
1961: Robert Sargent Shriver Jr., Director of the Peace Corps
1962: Henry Cabot Lodge, US Ambassador to the United Nations
1963: Lester B. Pearson, Prime Minister of Canada
1964: Thomas C. Mann, Assistant Secretary of State for Inter-American Affairs
1965: McGeorge Bundy, Special Assistant to the President for National Security Affairs
1966: Barbara Ward, economist, London, England
1967: Eugene J. McCarthy, U.S. Senator from Minnesota
1968: James A. Perkins, president of Cornell University
1969: Daniel P. Moynihan, Assistant to the President for Urban Affairs
1970: James E. Allen, Jr., U.S. Commissioner of Education
1971: Kenneth Keniston, Yale Medical School
1972: Kingman Brewster Jr., president of Yale University
1973: Malcolm Moos, president of the University of Minnesota
1974: Rosemary Park, professor of education, UCLA
1975: Alan J. Pifer, president of the Carnegie Corporation of New York and the Carnegie Foundation for the Advancement of Teaching
1976: Vernon E. Jordan Jr., Executive Director of the National Urban League
1977: Jimmy Carter, 39th President of the United States
1978: William F. Buckley Jr., editor of The National Review
1979: Joseph A. Califano Jr., Secretary of Health, Education, and Welfare
1980: Benjamin Civiletti, Attorney General of the United States
1981: Ronald Reagan, 40th President of the United States
1982: Pierre Trudeau, Prime Minister of Canada
1983: Cardinal Joseph Bernadin, Archbishop of Chicago
1984: Loret Miller Ruppe, Director of the Peace Corps 
1985: Jose Napoleon Duarte Fuentes, President of El Salvador
1986: Bishop James W. Malone, Bishop of Youngstown and president of the United States Catholic Conference
1987: Derek Bok, president of Harvard University
1988: Andrew Jackson Young, Mayor of Atlanta, Georgia
1989: Peter Ueberroth, Commissioner of Major League Baseball
1990: Bill Cosby, actor and producer
1991: Margaret O'Brien Steinfels, editor of Commonweal
1992: George H. W. Bush, 41st President of the United States
1993: Tom Brokaw, NBC news anchor
1994: Albert Reynolds, Taoiseach (Prime Minister) of Ireland
1995: Condoleezza Rice, Provost of Stanford University (later U.S. Secretary of State)
1996: Mary Ann Glendon, Learned Hand professor of law, Harvard University
1997: Mark Shields, political Commentator and columnist
1998: Joe E. Kernan, Indiana Lieutenant Governor
1999: Elizabeth Dole, president of the American Red Cross
2000: Kofi Annan, Secretary-General of the United Nations
2001: George W. Bush, 43rd President of the United States
2002: Tim Russert, host of NBC's Meet the Press
2003: Richard Lugar, U.S. Senator from Indiana
2004: Alan Page, Associate Justice of the Minnesota Supreme Court
2005: Vartan Gregorian, president of the Carnegie Corporation
2006: Mary McAleese, President of Ireland
2007: Jeffrey Immelt, CEO of General Electric
2008: Cardinal Theodore E. McCarrick, Archbishop Emeritus of Washington, D.C.
2009: Barack Obama, 44th President of the United States
2010: Brian Williams, anchor of NBC Nightly News
2011: Robert Gates, Secretary of Defense
2012: Haley Scott DeMaria, alumna and motivational speaker
2013: Cardinal Timothy Dolan, Archbishop of New York
2014: Ray Hammond II Founder of Bethel African Methodist Episcopal Church
2015: Lord Chris Patten (Lord Patten of Barnes), Chancellor of the University of Oxford
2016: General Martin E. Dempsey, Chairman of the Joint Chiefs of Staff
2017: Mike Pence, 48th Vice President of the United States
2018: Sérgio Moro
2019: Peggy Noonan
2020: Bartholomew I of Constantinople (cancelled due to the COVID19 pandemic. The 2020 Commencement Celebration was held in 2022 and the speaker was John Crowley).
2021: Jimmy Dunne, Financier and Notre Dame Trustee
2022: Borys Gudziak, Archeparch of the Ukrainian Catholic Archeparchy of Philadelphia
2023: Juan Manuel Santos, former President of Colombia and recipient of the 2016 Nobel Peace Prize

See also
Commencement at Central Connecticut State University
List of commencement speakers at Harvard University
List of Fordham University commencement speakers

References

External links 

University of Notre Dame
Graduation